The Tahiti national football team (French: Équipe de football de Tahiti) represents French Polynesia and is controlled by the Fédération Tahitienne de Football. The team consists of a selection of players from French Polynesia, not just Tahiti, and has competed in the Oceania Football Confederation (OFC) since 1990.

Tahiti is traditionally one of the stronger footballing nations of the Pacific Islands, with the second-best record at the football section of the South Pacific Games, with five victories. They were runners-up in the first three instalments of the Nations Cup (1973, 1980 and 1996). The nation went through a period of less success, but showed promise when it qualified for the 2009 FIFA U-20 World Cup in Egypt. This success was followed up with the title of 2012 OFC Nations Cup, becoming the first team other than Australia and New Zealand to win the competition.

History
Tahiti played its first full match on 21 September 1952, at home against New Zealand, drawing 2–2. Seven days later, the two teams played again and New Zealand won 5–3. On 30 September, they played each other for a third time, and Tahiti gained its first victory, by 2–0. However, it is unknown whether this was a full international match.

In September 1953, Tahiti played three matches in New Caledonia against its national side, losing the first 5–0 and the later two 4–1. They then travelled to the New Hebrides (now Vanuatu) and beat its national side 4–2 twice. In 1969, touring World Champions England beat Tahiti 4–1 in an exhibition match. In 1989, under the leadership of Napoleon Spitz, the official federation was created.

Tahiti entered its first World Cup qualification with the aim of reaching the 1994 World Cup, held in the United States. They were placed in Group A alongside Australia and the Solomon Islands, and played their first match away to the Solomon Islands in Honiara on 11 July 1992. Eric Etaeta equalised for Tahiti to make it 1–1 in the 76th minute. On 11 September, Tahiti hosted Australia in Papeete and lost 3–0. The next fixture was again against Australia, and resulted in a 2–0 away defeat in Brisbane on 20 September. On 9 October, in Papeete, Tahiti defeated the Solomon Islands 4–2. Tahiti's first goal was scored as an 8th-minute penalty from Reynald Temarii, a politician and current president of the OFC. However, Tahiti finished second to Australia in the group and did not advance.

2012 OFC Nations Cup
In 2012, the new edition of the tournament occurred in the Solomon Islands with the host country, New Zealand, New Caledonia, Vanuatu, Tahiti, Fiji, Papua New Guinea and Samoa (winner of the qualifying tournament) playing the competition. Tahiti defeated New Caledonia in the final in Lawson Tama Stadium 1–0 with a goal by Steevy Chong Hue and became the first team other than Australia (no longer part of OFC) and New Zealand to be crowned Oceania champions.

2013 Confederations Cup
By winning the 2012 OFC Nations Cup, Tahiti qualified for the 2013 Confederations Cup, held in Brazil, for the first time. Tahiti is the first – and so far only – team which has participated in the Confederations Cup but has never qualified for the FIFA World Cup. On 17 June 2013, Tahiti lost 1–6 to Nigeria in the 2013 Confederations Cup in Belo Horizonte, with Jonathan Tehau scoring the goal for Tahiti in the second half with a header from a corner; Tahiti fans still rejoiced in the prospect of scoring a goal in an international tournament. On 20 June, Tahiti lost 10–0 against Spain to equal their largest ever loss against New Zealand nine years earlier. On 23 June 2013, Tahiti was beaten 8–0 by Uruguay.

In all, Tahiti conceded 24 goals and scored 1 to end with a goal differential of −23, the worst of any national team in any major competition. However, even with the poor record and heavy defeats, Tahiti's underdog qualities gathered significant respect from the people of Brazil, who always cheered for them in every match. Spanish coach Vicente del Bosque, and strikers Fernando Torres and David Villa – who scored four and three goals respectively against Tahiti – complimented the team's fair play.

2022 FIFA World Cup qualification (OFC)
After two matches canceled due to COVID-19, the Tahitians have finally returned to the qualifying tournament for the World Cup in Qatar. Unfortunately, the Toa Aito couldn't beat Solomon Islands and finished second in Group A. Solomon Islands led in the score in the 20th minute, the Tahitians came back into the match thanks to Alvin Tehau's equalizer in the 26th minute. Solomon Islands then made the difference on the return from the half on a lightning counterattack before taking the lead more widely at the end of the match 1–3.

Team image

Kit sponsorship

Fixtures and results

In March 2022, Tahiti will play their first matches since they took part in the 2019 Pacific Games.

2022

2023

Coaching history

 Freddy Vernaudon (1973)
 Richard Vansam (1980)
 François Ferez (1992)
 Bernard Vahirua (1992)
 Umberto Mottini (1995–1996)
 Gerard Kautai (1996)
 Richard Vansam (1997)
 Alain Rousseau (1998)
 Leon Gardikiotis (1999–2000)
 Patrick Jacquemet (2001–2003)
 Gerard Kautai (2004–2007)
 Eddy Etaeta (2010–2015)
 Ludovic Graugnard (2015–2018)
 Naea Bennett (2018-2019)
 Samuel Garcia (2019–present)

Players

Current squad
The following players were called up for the 2022 FIFA World Cup qualification matches in March 2022.

Caps and goals updated as of 27 March 2022, after the game against New Zealand.

Player records

Players in bold are still active with Tahiti.

Most capped players

Top goalscorers

Competitive record

FIFA World Cup

FIFA Confederations Cup

OFC Nations Cup

Pacific Games

Polynesia Cup

Coupe de l'Outre-Mer

Head-to-head record

See also

Tahiti national rugby union team

Notes

References

External links

Official Web Site
FIFA Profile

 
National football teams of Overseas France
Oceanian national association football teams